Mir Zahoor Hussain Khan Khoso (Urdu: ظہور حسین کھوسو) served as the Speaker of the Balochistan Assembly from 31 May 1990 to 17 November 1990. He was affiliated with the Balochistan National Party.

In 2005, Zahoor helped negotiate a political truce between his Khoso tribe and the Jamalis tribe in Jaffarabad district.

References

Living people
Pakistani politicians
Baloch people
Year of birth missing (living people)